In centrifugation the clearing factor or k factor represents the relative pelleting efficiency of a given centrifuge rotor at maximum rotation speed. It can be used to estimate the time  (in hours) required for sedimentation of a fraction with a known sedimentation coefficient  (in svedbergs):

 

The value of the clearing factor depends on the maximum angular velocity  of a centrifuge (in rad/s) and the minimum and maximum radius  of the rotor:

 

As the rotational speed of a centrifuge is usually specified in RPM, the following formula is often used for convenience:

 

Centrifuge manufacturers usually specify the minimum, maximum and average radius of a rotor, as well as the  factor of a centrifuge-rotor combination.

For runs with a rotational speed lower than the maximum rotor-speed, the  factor has to be adjusted:

 2 

The K-factor is related to the sedimentation coefficient  by the formula:

Where  is the time to pellet a certain particle in hours. Since  is a constant for a certain particle, this relationship can be used to interconvert between different rotors.

In this manner, one does not need access to the exact rotor cited in a protocol, as long as the K-factor can be calculated. Many online calculators are available to perform the calculations for common rotors.

References

External links
 Beckman Coulter lab resources and manuals
 Appendix F of the Cell Biology Laboratory Manual

Laboratory techniques
Unit operations